Recaș is a town in Timiș County, Romania. Six villages are administered by the town: Bazoș, Herneacova, Izvin, Nadăș, Petrovaselo and Stanciova. It received town status in April 2004.

Name

Geography 
Recaș covers an area of 231.98 km2 (2.66% of the total area of Timiș County) and is located in an area of sunny hills, favorable to agriculture.

Recaș is crossed to the south by the Timiș River and the Bega Canal. The climate is temperate continental with a slight Mediterranean influence, the winters being generally mild, the summers warm, the autumns long and the transitions from winter to summer quite sudden. Climatic and soil characteristics make this area particularly conducive to viticulture.

History 
The oldest mention of Recaș dates from 1318. Since the Middle Ages it is called as it is today (Rekas in 1450). Its name has a Slavic root (rika = stream), but there is evidence that the village was Vlach. Thus, historian  shows that, in 1359, several Romanian families from Moldavia settled in Recaș, who received land and privileges from King Louis the Great, without being forced to give up Orthodoxy. But a little later the Bulgarians received the same rights, so the ethnic composition was more varied.

It was noticed early on as an important center in the region. In 1470 there was an oppidum Rekas, which comprised 20 localities. It therefore received town privileges, and there was even a customs office here. In 1650, Serbs from the Bačka area settled in Recaș. The locals called them șocați ("shocked") because they were of Catholic religion and, according to some opinions, were Croats.

Following the waves of colonization, in the middle of the 17th century, three distinct settlements were formed: Recașul Valahilor (Vlașnița; "Vlachs' Recaș"), Recașul Șocaților (of the Serbs) and Recașul Bulgarilor ("Bulgarians' Recaș"). The Romanians had a less favorable location, close to the Timiș River, in the area of today's train station. Due to frequent floods and conflicts with the Serbs, they were forced to move, with many settling in the neighboring village of Izvin. Therefore, when the Habsburgs conquered Banat and drew up the first census, the "Vlachs' Recaș" appears as depopulated.

Under the Habsburgs, Recaș experienced a new stage of development, and colonization continued. In 1764, administrator Koll brought a large number of German settlers, who formed the nucleus of the "German Recaș". Until 1786, several waves of Swabian emigrants settled in Recaș in search of a better life. After Banat came under Hungarian administration, a process of Hungarianization and colonization with Hungarians took place. Hungarianization actually began around 1809, and the largest wave of Hungarian colonists settled in Recaș in 1899. In the late 19th and early 20th centuries, Recaș experienced an unprecedented period of development, polarizing social and economic life in the area (prefecture seat, court, land registry office and preception). In 1894 the brick factory with 100 employees was built, and in 1902 the first German newspaper, Temesrekaser Zeitung, appeared with weekly editions. During the interwar period, Recaș had a primary school, a Catholic confessional school, a casino, a fire brigade, a German agricultural circle and a sports club.

During the socialist period, Recaș had the status of a commune with six villages belonging to it (Bazoș, Herneacova, Izvin, Nadăș, Petrovaselo and Stanciova). Following a local referendum and the fulfillment of the necessary administrative conditions, Recaș acquired in 2004 the status of town.

Demographics 

Recaș had a population of 8,336 inhabitants at the 2011 census, down 3% from the 2002 census. Most inhabitants are Romanians (77.05%), larger minorities being represented by Hungarians (7.62%), Serbs (4.27%) and Roma (2.14%). For 6.9% of the population, ethnicity is unknown. By religion, most inhabitants are Orthodox (67.61%), but there are also minorities of Roman Catholics (10.83%), Pentecostals (8.28%), Serbian Orthodox (3.61%) and Baptists (1.26%). For 6.91% of the population, religious affiliation is unknown.

Natives
 Ion Cojar (1931–2009), acting teacher and theatre director

Economy 

The area is best known for the quality of its wines. Recaș Wineries, a company founded in 1991, is the largest producer and exporter of wines in Romania. However, viticulture has a much older tradition in the area, which dates back to the 15th century. The grape varieties grown by Recaș Wineries are: Merlot, Pinot Noir, Cabernet Franc, Syrah, Negru de Drăgășani, Novac, Acalon, Cabernet Dorsa, Zweigelt, Cadarcă, Chardonnay, Sauvignon Blanc, Fetească Regală, Fetească Albă, Pinot Gris, Viognier, Muscat Ottonel, Furmint, Italian Riesling and Rhine Riesling.

It is noteworthy, however, that in recent years economic activity has begun to diversify.

Twin towns 
Recaș is twinned with:
  Nova Crnja

References 

Towns in Romania
Populated places in Timiș County
Localities in Romanian Banat